The John Bridges Tavern and Store Site is a historic tavern complex site located along Illinois Route 146 near Buncombe, Illinois. The tavern and store were built in the early 1830s by either John Bridges, Sr., or his son John Bridges, Jr. In 1838 and 1839, the Trail of Tears passed through southern Illinois, and the tavern and store served as a stopping place for Cherokee who had been removed from their homeland. Additionally, a spring on the property provided a water source for the Cherokee and their animals. The tavern burned down in 1940, and the complex has been partially demolished, but some remains of the store still stand and archaeological investigations have been conducted at the site.

The site was added to the National Register of Historic Places on May 8, 2017.

References

Commercial buildings on the National Register of Historic Places in Illinois
Buildings and structures in Johnson County, Illinois
National Register of Historic Places in Johnson County, Illinois
Trail of Tears